CKLM-FM is a Canadian radio station, broadcasting at 106.1 FM in Lloydminster, Alberta/Saskatchewan. The station airs an active rock format branded as 106.1 The Goat.

Licensed in 2000 to Peace River Broadcasting, the station was acquired by Stewart and Anita Dent (shareholders of Peace River Broadcasting) in 2001 through their numbered holding company 912038 Alberta Ltd.

The station launched on May 18, 2001. The station added a rebroadcaster at Bonnyville on August 22, 2003, which subsequently became an independent station, CFNA, on September 28, 2007. The Canadian Radio-television and Telecommunications Commission approved the stations' sale to the Vista Broadcast Group on November 21, 2008.

References

External links
 106.1 The Goat
 
 

KLM
KLM
KLM
KLM
KLM
Radio stations established in 2001
2001 establishments in Alberta
2001 establishments in Saskatchewan